HESA Shahed 285 is a light attack/reconnaissance helicopter developed in Iran. It is being produced in two versions: a light attack/recon version and a maritime patrol/anti-ship version.

Design and development

The Shahed 285 is based on the composite Shahed-278, which is a relatively light helicopter with  empty weight, derived from the Bell 206 Jetranger. Compared to the American OH-58 Kiowa that retains the airframe of the Bell 206, the Shahed 285 is a single-seater with a narrower fuselage, but retains the tail and powerplant / rotor structures, and is intended for military use. Although designed by the IRGC, this helicopter is scheduled to be produced by HESA.

Shahed 285 comes in two variants. AH-85A which is a land based variant and AH-85C which is a naval one. AH-85A is armed with 14  rockets and a PKMT light machine gun either on a rotatable turret or on a static mount, or an NSV heavy machine gun in an underfuselage gondola (latest version). It also uses an EO/IR camera on its top.

Instead of the machine gun, AH-85C has a search and track radar on its chin to find and track enemy ships. It either uses two Kowsar or eight Sadid-1 anti-ship missiles. To fire these missiles, AH-85C relies on a Multi-function display in its cockpit.

Specifications (Shahed 285 / AH-58A)

See also

 Atlas XH-1 Alpha
 Bell 207 Sioux Scout
 Cicaré CH-14 Aguilucho
 IAR 317 Airfox

References

External links
 Military Factory

2000s Iranian helicopters
2000s Iranian military utility aircraft
Shahed 285
Military helicopters